Deer Island is an unincorporated community and census-designated place in Columbia County, Oregon, United States. As of the 2010 census it had a population of 294.

The community is located along U.S. Route 30 north-northwest of Columbia City. Deer Island has a post office with ZIP code 97054.

Demographics

References

Unincorporated communities in Columbia County, Oregon
Census-designated places in Oregon
Census-designated places in Columbia County, Oregon
Unincorporated communities in Oregon